iBus is an Automatic Vehicle Location (AVL) system to improve London's buses using technology installed by Siemens AG. The system tracks all of London's 9300 buses to provide passengers with audio-visual announcements, improved information on bus arrivals, and to trigger priority at traffic junctions.

On 16 June 2005 it was reported that London's buses 'fail' deaf people. As a result, the iBus system was announced on 16 January 2006 and was tried on route 149 for an eight-week trial. The system was proved to be successful, and on 18 May 2006, radio presenter Emma Hignett was announced to be the 'Voice of London's Buses' after 99% in the survey said she had the right voice. iBus was launched on many routes in 2007 and continued throughout 2008 and 2009. All routes now have the system.

Announcements
Upon boarding the bus, for example, route 240 serving Edgware, iBus plays the announcement "240 to Edgware Station" and corresponding text appears on the visual displays. As the bus approaches the stop, the on-board system will announce and display the bus stop name. Since March 2014, the space below this name shows the current time. When a passenger has requested the bus to stop, this is replaced by the message "Bus Stopping". Sometimes when an Underground line is closed, or special events take place, the space below would also display information about that type of event occurring and to inform passengers to take alternative routes to reach their destination.

Similarly to the London Underground, iBus has a feature that tells passengers to alight at a key stop, which is near a key place that the bus will not serve. For example, a bus arriving near the Tate Modern art gallery will say, "Lavington Street. Alight here for Tate Modern." and the following message will scroll across the dot matrix indicators.
Lavington Street for Tate Modern

Each bus contains a Microsoft Windows-based computer that has the details of all 19,000 bus stops in London. The system has over 30,000 announcements for 700 bus routes.

Alongside route information, iBus can also play ‘operational’ pre-recorded announcements to passengers on board the bus.

Tracking
The iBus system aims to provide a better fix on bus locations than the old Selective Vehicle Detection (SVD) system. iBus can locate every bus to an accuracy of about ten metres, or its distance from the nearest stop by around ten seconds. It does this using several instruments:

 Global Positioning System (GPS)
 Odometers, including speedometer
 Turn-rate sensor
 Rate gyro

The essential part of the system relies on GPS satellite data that roughly determine the location of a bus down to 100 metres. Data collected from GPS is passed into a Kalman filter, and other data including velocity and temperature is calculated on the bus and transmitted every 30 seconds via GPRS. With the bus network map, this helps the Central System to make a "best guess" of the bus position and depicts the overall image derived from the data provided by all buses, even in areas with poor GPS reception. The Central System can update the countdown signs as before that now has a more accurate prediction derived from all this data. Knowing the location of the bus, controllers have the means to regulate the service more efficiently, and priority can be given to a bus at traffic lights.

CentreComm, the 24/7 Emergency Command and Control Centre, is able to track the location of every bus in the fleet and can share this information immediately with the emergency services in the event of an emergency or accident.

Other applications

Although iBus was rolled out in 2008, it was not until 2011 that the data was made available to other applications, such as text messaging and the Internet.

With text messaging, bus users can send a text with the bus stop code to receive realtime bus arrival times for that stop.  Visually impaired passengers will be able to use the text-to-speech facility on their mobile phones to get the information too. However, users will have the pay the standard network rate for sending the text, plus an additional 12p charge to receive the response.

On the Internet, the latest service information is available using mobile web or the Internet.

Countdown signs are signs at bus stops giving users information about when the next bus is due.  With iBus, Countdown is able to provide real-time information at 2,500 key bus stops in London.  Communications improvements have also meant that Countdown can now display service updates, disruption information and network-wide messages.  The rollout of the new signs at key locations was completed in June 2012.  iBus was integrated with Countdown by Telent.  And the signs were supplied, installed and maintenance by ACIS and Trueform. IVU.realtime from IVU Traffic Technologies AG, Germany, forms the central system of Countdown II.

iBus supplies data to the Transport for London open data systems in order to allow external websites, such as bustimes.org, to provide live bus position and countdown information.

Cost

The cost of fitting iBus to buses and garages up to 3 January 2009 was £18.8m which was part of a Transport for London (TfL) £117m upgrade to the bus fleet communications system.

Complaints
The number of complaints received from bus companies or TfL employees relating to the use of the iBus between 23 January 2008 and 11 February 2009 was 254.  Most of these complaints were due to faults in iBus, with the majority stating there were no display data or no announcements being made.  However, there were also complaints associated with incorrect display data and announcements.

In early 2018, TfL received criticism from both passengers and the media following the introduction of an iBus announcement warning passengers when the vehicle was about to start moving. The warning was added with the aim of reducing the number of injuries caused by passengers losing balance when the bus accelerated, but it was largely considered an annoyance because the announcement was repeated at every stop, usually after the bus had already been travelling for several seconds. TfL attempted to adjust the timing and wording of the announcement (from "Please hold on; the bus is about to move" to "Please hold on while the bus is moving") but the announcement was eventually removed at the end of a trial period.

See also
 Selective vehicle detection

References

External links 

 
 All London's buses now fitted with iBus. Transport for London. 23 April 2009

Bus transport in London